"Little Diane" is a song written and performed by Dion featuring The Del-Satins.  The song reached number 8 on the Billboard Hot 100 in 1962.  It was featured on his 1962 album, Lovers Who Wander.

The song was arranged by Glen Stuart.

The song was ranked number 86 on Billboard magazine's Top Hot 100 songs of 1962.

Other versions
Rivers Cuomo released a version on his 2007 album Alone: The Home Recordings of Rivers Cuomo which featured the band Sloan.

References

1962 songs
1962 singles
Songs written by Dion DiMucci
Dion DiMucci songs
Sloan (band) songs
Laurie Records singles